Events from the year 1421 in France.

Incumbents
 Monarch – Charles VI

Events
 21 March - Battle of Baugé is fought during the Hundred Years War. The English commander Thomas, Duke of Clarence, younger brother of Henry V, is killed in battle

Births
 6 December - Henry VI of England, son of Catherine of Valois and claimant to the French throne (died 1471)

Deaths
 21 June - Jean Le Maingre, soldier (born 1366)

References

1420s in France